Gonatocerus is a genus of fairyflies in the family Mymaridae. There are at least 260 described species in Gonatocerus.

See also
 List of Gonatocerus species

References

Further reading

External links

 

Mymaridae